Mimi is a 1935 British romance film directed by Paul L. Stein and starring Douglas Fairbanks Jr., Gertrude Lawrence and Diana Napier. Set in nineteenth century Paris, the screenplay concerns a composer who becomes inspired by a young woman he encounters. The film is based on the 1851 novel La Vie de Bohème by Henri Murger. The score includes arrangements of Giacomo Puccini's music from the opera La bohème, arranged by George H. Clutsam.

The film was made at Elstree Studios, with sets designed by the art director Cedric Dawe.

Cast
 Douglas Fairbanks Jr. as Rodolphe 
 Gertrude Lawrence as Mimi 
 Diana Napier as Madame Sidonie 
 Harold Warrender as Marcel 
 Carol Goodner as Musette 
 Richard Bird as Colline 
 Martin Walker as Schaunard 
 Austin Trevor as Lamotte 
 Laurence Hanray as Barbemouche 
 Paul Graetz as Durand 
 Jack Raine as Duke

Reception
Writing for The Spectator, Graham Greene described the film as evoking a "happy juvenility" and attributed its success to the superior acting skills of Fairbanks and Lawrence, and to the wardrobe designed by Doris Zinkeisen.

References

Bibliography
 Low, Rachael. Filmmaking in 1930s Britain. George Allen & Unwin, 1985.
 Wood, Linda. British Films, 1927-1939. British Film Institute, 1986.

External links
 

1935 films
1935 romantic drama films
1930s historical romance films
British romantic drama films
Films shot at British International Pictures Studios
Films based on Scenes of Bohemian Life
Films directed by Paul L. Stein
Films set in Paris
Films set in the 19th century
Films about composers
British black-and-white films
British historical romance films
1930s English-language films
1930s British films